The 1950 Marquette Hilltoppers football team was an American football team that represented Marquette University as an independent during the 1950 college football season. In its first season under head coach Lisle Blackbourn, the team compiled a 5–3–1 record and outscored all opponents by a total of 204 to 145. The team played its home games at Marquette Stadium in Milwaukee.

Schedule

References

Marquette
Marquette Golden Avalanche football seasons
Marquette Hilltoppers football